The 2016 Delaware lieutenant gubernatorial election was held on November 8, 2016, coinciding with the Delaware gubernatorial election. The office had been vacant since former Democratic lieutenant governor Matthew Denn was inaugurated as attorney general on January 6, 2015.

Democratic primary

Candidates

Declared
 Sherry Dorsey Walker, Wilmington City Councilwoman and candidate for the State Senate in 2014
 Brad Eaby, Kent County Levy Court Commissioner
 Greg Fuller, former Sussex County Register of Wills
 Bethany Hall-Long, state senator
 Kathy McGuiness, Rehoboth Beach Commissioner
 Ciro Poppiti, New Castle County Register of Wills

Declined
 Chris Bullock, president of the New Castle County Council
 Peter Schwartzkopf, Speaker of the Delaware House of Representatives

Results

Republican primary
State Senator Colin Bonini had announced that he was running for governor in November 2014, but reportedly was considering switching to run for lieutenant governor.  Bonini announced on November 23, 2015, that he would remain in the race for governor.

Candidates

Declared
 La Mar Gunn, president of the NAACP of Central Delaware and nominee for Kent County Recorder of Deeds in 2014

Declined
 Colin Bonini, state senator and nominee for state treasurer in 2010 (running for governor)

See also
 Delaware gubernatorial election, 2016

References

External links
Official campaign websites
 Sherry Dorsey Walker for Lieutenant Governor
 Brad Eaby for Lieutenant Governor
 Greg Fuller for Lieutenant Governor
 La Mar Gunn for Lieutenant Governor
 Bethany Hall-Long for Lieutenant Governor
 Kathy McGuiness for Lieutenant Governor
 Ciro Poppiti for Lieutenant Governor

2016
Delaware
Lieutenant Governor